The New York Wine & Grape Foundation is a New York State public-benefit corporation. Its mission is to provide an effective and continuous program of research, promotion and education to strengthen New York State's wine and grape industry's position in the marketplace. As of 2018, it had an 8 member staff and a 20 member board of directors.

See also
 Agriculture & New York State Horse Breeding Development Fund
 New York Racing Association
 New York State Thoroughbred Breeding and Development Fund Corporation
 Olympic Regional Development Authority

References

External links

Wine industry organizations
Politics of New York (state)
Public benefit corporations